Abeer Macintyre is the Managing Director of specialist voluntary sector agency BTA (Bruce Tait Associates).  She joined the company in 2015 following previous successful roles at several children's charities.

Abeer joined the voluntary sector after a career in broadcasting and was formerly a regular presenter and journalist at BBC Scotland from 1994 to 2009, presenting the station's flagship radio programme Good Morning Scotland and as a presenter of the station's news and political TV broadcasts.

Early life

Abeer Macintyre was born in Amman, Jordan in December 1964 to a Jordanian father and Irish mother. She spent the first five years of her life living in Beirut, Lebanon before moving to Belfast with her mother and two sisters after her parents separated. She studied English and Drama at the University of Kent, graduating in 1987.

Career in TV and radio

At BBC Scotland she presented Good Morning Scotland, the station's flagship breakfast programme. She continued in this role for fifteen years, while also working on televised news and politics programmes, including Reporting Scotland, Frontline Scotland and Newsnight Scotland.

Charity career

In 2009 Macintyre left BBC Scotland to become Head of Supporter Care at Mary's Meals. She then joined NSPCC Scotland as Strategic Head of Fundraising and then became Director of Development at Children in Scotland.

References

BBC Scotland newsreaders and journalists
Living people
People educated at the Belfast Royal Academy
Alumni of the University of Kent
1964 births
British women television journalists
British women radio presenters
Jordanian women radio presenters
Television presenters from Northern Ireland
Jordanian television people
Jordanian television presenters
Jordanian women television presenters
National Society for the Prevention of Cruelty to Children people
British nonprofit executives
Businesspeople from Belfast
Television personalities from Belfast